Dušan Kutlešić (born 30 October 1994) is a Serbian professional basketball player for Zastal Zielona Góra of the Polish Basketball League.

Professional career 
Kutlešić signed with Dynamic on August 29, 2018.

In April 2022, Zlatibor won the ABA League Second Division for the 2021–22 season following a 78–73 overtime win over MZT Skopje Aerodreom. He was named the Playoffs MVP.

On July 8, 2022, he has signed with Stelmet Zielona Góra of the Polish Basketball League (PLK).

References

External links 
 Profile at aba-liga.com
 Profile at draftexpress.com
 Profile at eurobasket.com
 Profile at fiba.com

Living people
1994 births
ABA League players
Basket Zielona Góra players
Basketball League of Serbia players
KK Borac Čačak players
KK Dynamic players
KK Metalac Valjevo players
KK FMP players
KK Sloboda Užice players
KK Vršac players
KK Zlatibor players
Serbian expatriate basketball people in Poland
Serbian expatriate basketball people in Romania
Serbian men's basketball players
Sportspeople from Užice
Shooting guards